Mulberroside A is a stilbenoid found in Morus alba, the white mulberry. It is the diglucoside of oxyresveratrol.

References 

Stilbenoid glycosides